Laurence Neil "Lol" Creme (born 19 September 1947) is an English musician and music video director, best known for his work in 10cc. He sings and plays guitar, bass and keyboards.

Biography
Creme was born in Prestwich, Lancashire, England. Like bandmates Graham Gouldman and Kevin Godley, Creme grew up in a Jewish household.  While attending art school in Birmingham, he took up the nickname Lolagon and met Kevin Godley. They joined the white R&B combo The Sabres (The Magic Lanterns), Hotlegs and other bands together, most significantly 10cc, and in 1976 they left 10cc together to record as Creme & Godley (later Godley & Creme). The pair became music video directors, working with bands including Yes. 

Creme directed the 1991 Jamaican comedy film The Lunatic.

In 1988, Creme became a member of the band Art of Noise, with Anne Dudley and Trevor Horn, and directed videos for the artists who recorded with them, such as Tom Jones. Further work with Horn followed, including forming the band The Trevor Horn Band Producers (now known as The Trevor Horn Band) with Chris Braide and Steve Lipson.

Family
Creme's son Lalo was a member of the 1990s indie-dance band Arkarna, and has also worked on a number of projects with his father. Creme's wife, Angie, is the sister of ex-10cc member Eric Stewart's wife, Gloria.

References

External links
 

1947 births
Living people
Art of Noise members
English rock guitarists
English male guitarists
English keyboardists
English male singers
English music video directors
English songwriters
Jewish English musicians
Jewish rock musicians
People from Prestwich
Ivor Novello Award winners
10cc members
The Trevor Horn Band members